Barry McDonald can refer to:

 Barry McDonald (gymnast) (born 1971), Irish Olympic gymnast
 Barry McDonald (rugby union) (1942–2020), Australian rugby player